Abeliophyllum, the miseonnamu, Korean abeliophyllum, white forsythia, or Korean abelialeaf, is a monotypic genus of flowering plants in the olive family, Oleaceae. It consists of one species, Abeliophyllum distichum , endemic to Korea, where it is endangered in the wild, occurring at only seven sites. It is related to Forsythia, but differs in having white, not yellow, flowers.

Description
The fruit is a round, winged samara  diameter. Almost looking like an elm tree fruit.

It is cultivated as an ornamental plant in Europe and North America. Hardy to USDA Zone 4.

Taxonomy
The genus name of Abeliophyllum is in honour of Clarke Abel (1780–1826), a British surgeon and naturalist. With the latin suffix of 'phyllum' meaning leaf. The Latin specific epithet of distichum means in two ranks, referring to the leaves.
It was first described and published in Bot. Mag. (Tokyo) Vol.33 on page 153 in 1919.

Conservation status
In 1998, a review of the plant's conservation status found that "it is close to extinction and qualifies for the IUCN Category of 'Critically Endangered', indicating a high risk of extinction in the near future."; but as of 2009 it has not yet been formally assessed for the IUCN Red List.

In 2015, IUCN classed the species as endangered.

References

University of British Columbia Botanical Gardens: Abeliophyllum distichum

Forsythieae
Endemic flora of Korea
Flora of Korea
Garden plants of Asia
Critically endangered plants
Monotypic Oleaceae genera
Taxa named by Takenoshin Nakai
Plants described in 1919